Maurice and Maralyn Bailey were a British couple who, in 1973, survived for 118 days on a rubber raft in the Pacific Ocean before being rescued.

Maralyn Bailey was born Maralyn Harrison on 24 April 1941 in Nottingham, England. Maralyn and Maurice married in 1963.

117 days adrift
Their survival story is known as 117 Days Adrift despite the duration actually being longer because initial news reports were wrong and it was decided to keep this name for consistency.

The Bailey's journey began when they left Southampton, England, in their  yacht Auralyn. Their intended destination was New Zealand. They passed safely through the Panama Canal in February and were on their way to the Galapagos Islands. At dawn on 4 March 1973, their yacht was struck by a whale and severely damaged. After transferring some supplies to an inflated life raft and dinghy and salvaging some food, a compass, and other supplies, the Baileys watched as Auralyn disappeared beneath the waves. To survive, they collected rainwater and when their meager food supplies ran out, began eating sea creatures such as turtles, seabirds and fish caught by hand or with safety pins fashioned into hooks. As they drifted in the open Pacific, the couple saw seven ships, but were unable to attract these ships' attention since their signal flares failed and their emergency kit did not contain a signalling mirror. Their life raft began to disintegrate and required frequent reinflation. They read and played card games early in their ordeal, but later the Baileys suffered terribly from malnutrition and friction-induced sores, the latter worsening due to the wet conditions in the raft. They encountered sharks and dolphins and had to endure severe storms.

Sailors on the ship spotted the raft after initially passing it by. The couple was brought aboard in an emaciated state, having lost some  apiece and with their legs barely able to support their weight. Weolmi 306 brought them to Honolulu, Hawaii.

Aftermath
The Baileys returned to England and wrote an account of their ordeal entitled 117 Days Adrift (published with the title Staying Alive! in the United States), which was published in 1974 by Adlard Coles Nautical. The following year, they returned to the sea in their new yacht, Auralyn II.

Maralyn Bailey died in 2002 at the age of 61.
Maurice Bailey died in December 2018.

External links 
117 Days Adrift on Google Books
Obituary for Maralyn Bailey from The Daily Telegraph, London, June 13 2002

See also
 Ambrogio Fogar, survived 74 days adrift in the South Atlantic with Mauro Mancini (died 2 days after the rescue)
 José Salvador Alvarenga, survived 438 days adrift in the Pacific.
 Steven Callahan, survived 76 days adrift in the Atlantic.
 Dougal Robertson, survived 38 days adrift in the Pacific.
 Rose-Noëlle, trimaran on which four people survived 119 days adrift in the South Pacific.
 Poon Lim, who survived for 133 days adrift in the Atlantic.

1941 births
1970s missing person cases
2002 deaths
2018 deaths
British sailors
Castaways
Formerly missing people
Maritime incidents in 1973
Married couples
Shipwrecks in the Pacific Ocean

General
List of people who disappeared mysteriously at sea